Lynn Carol Rainbow-Reid  (born 19 September 1942) credited also as Lynne Rainbow, is an Australian-based former theatre and television actor  and voice artist, who was educated at Ascham School, The Sorbonne and Dante Alighieri in Italy.  Lynn was the daughter of Judge Alfred Rainbow and the granddaughter of Sir Benjamin Fuller a theatrical entrepreneur. During the 1970s she was married to actor Tom Oliver. 
  
She received the Order of Australia AM, in the Queen's Birthday honours in 2016,for service to culture and the arts.

Actress 
She became widely recognisable in the early 1970s on Australian television, taking many guest roles in the Crawford Productions police dramas Homicide, Division 4 and Matlock Police. She also appeared in an episode of popular situation comedy series The Group.

From March 1972 played the original regular character of chemist Sonia Freeman in the phenomenally successful sex-comedy television soap opera Number 96. She stayed in the role until 1973 during which time Sonia engaged in an inter-racial kiss, lost her husband in a car accident, and was targeted by a woman planning to send her mad.  
 
Rainbow reprised the role of Sonia Freeman in the feature film version of the serial, Number 96, in 1974. In the film, a newly married Sonia returns to Number 96 but again worries she is losing her mind. Rainbow shot all her scenes for the film in a single day, before rushing off to give a theatre performance as Elvira in Blithe Spirit that night.

After Number 96 Rainbow continued to make guest starring appearances in Australian television drama series, had a role in miniseries Against the Wind (1978), took a regular role in soap opera The Young Doctors, guest starred in six episodes of A Country Practice, and appeared in an early episode of Home and Away.

Filmography (selected)

External links

1942 births
Living people
Australian film actresses
Australian stage actresses
Australian television actresses
Australian people of English descent
University of Paris alumni
People educated at Ascham School
Members of the Order of Australia